Jayanta Debnath (born on 29 July 1983 in Agartala) is an Indian first-class cricketer who played for Tripura .

References

Cricketers_from_Tripura
Indian_cricketers
Tripura cricketers
Living people
1983 births